The Law of the Wilds is a 1915 American silent short drama film directed by Thomas Ricketts and starring Harry Van Meter, Reaves Eason, and Jack Richardson.

Cast
 Harry Van Meter as Frank Storm
 Reaves Eason as Steve Baker
 Jack Richardson as Pete Lear
 Perry Banks as Storekeeper
 Emma Kluge as Storekeeper's Wife
 Vivian Rich as Jennie
 Arthur Millett as Sheriff
 Louise Lester

External links

1915 films
1915 drama films
Silent American drama films
American silent short films
American black-and-white films
1915 short films
Films directed by Tom Ricketts
1910s American films